Hillcrest High School is a state coeducational secondary school located in south-eastern Hamilton, New Zealand. The school is named after the suburb of Hillcrest for which it serves, although the school itself is actually located in Silverdale.

History
Hillcrest High School is the youngest school out of the ten state and state-integrated secondary schools in Hamilton, opening for instruction for the first time in January 1972. Like many New Zealand state secondary schools built in the 1970s, Hillcrest was built to the S68 standard design. The school has three full-sized S68 blocks (B, C, and D blocks) and one half-sized S68 block (western half of E block – the eastern half is a later addition).

Enrolment
At the April 2013 Education Review Office (ERO) review of the school, Hillcrest High School had 1630 students, including 35 international students. The school roll's gender composition was 47% male and 53% female, and its ethnic composition was 52% New Zealand European (Pākehā), 20.5% Asian, 14% Māori, 7% other European, and 4% Pacific Islanders.

Curriculum
The school examines students using the New Zealand standard, National Certificate of Educational Achievement (NCEA). Cambridge examinations for Mathematics and English are also available for able Year 12 students.
A wide variety of subjects can be taken at Hillcrest High, ranging from Visual Art to Mechanics, international languages as well as standard subjects such as English, Mathematics and Science.

Hillcrest students received a total of 54 scholarships, the sixth highest number of scholarships of any high school in the North Island. Seven Hillcrest students received Top Scholar Awards from the New Zealand Qualifications Authority between 2002–5. A student in 2008 scored 99% in the Cambridge English exam, achieving the highest score in the world.

Motto
There are two commonplace Latin pronunciations: in Ecclesiastical Latin the school motto 'Circumspice' is pronounced chir-koom-spee-cheh, in Classical Latin it is pronounced as keer-koom-speek-eh. It means 'look around you'.

Notable people
James Baker, first-class cricketer
Kimbra Johnson, musician based in Melbourne, Australia. Graduated from this school in 2007
Laura Langman, plays for the Silver Ferns, the New Zealand international Netball team. Graduated from this school in 2003.
Jesse Mulligan, TV presenter. Graduated from this school in 1992.
Anjali Mulari, New Zealand ice and inline hockey player. Graduated from this school in 2010.
Phum Viphurit, musician. Graduated in 2013
Sonia Waddell, graduated from this school in 1991. Represented New Zealand in rowing at the 2000 and 2004 Summer Olympics

References

External links
 Education Review Office (ERO) reports for Hillcrest High School

Secondary schools in Hamilton, New Zealand
Educational institutions established in 1972
New Zealand secondary schools of S68 plan construction
1972 establishments in New Zealand